Harry Mellor may refer to:
Harry Mellor (footballer, born 1878) (1878–1950), footballer with Crewe Alexandra, Stoke and Grimsby Town
Harry Mellor (footballer, born 1895), played in the Football League for Nelson